Curtido is a type of lightly fermented cabbage relish. It is commonly served alongside pupusas, the national delicacy.

Fellow Central American country Belize has a similar recipe called "curtido" by its Spanish speakers; however, it is a spicy, fermented relish made with onions, habaneros, and vinegar. It is used to top salbutes, garnaches, and other common dishes in Belizean cuisine.

See also
 Encurtido – a pickled vegetable appetizer, side dish and condiment in the Mesoamerican region

References

Belizean cuisine
Brassica oleracea dishes
Cabbage dishes
Condiments
Fermented foods
Guatemalan cuisine
Mexican cuisine
Pickles
Salads
Salvadoran cuisine